Reggae Gold 2012 is a compilation reggae album from VP Records. It was released on June 26, 2012 and Reggae Gold is an annual series from VP Records. It was launched in 1992. This Reggae Gold 2012 is the 20th edition of the series and it is a double disc CD which commemorates the series’ 20th anniversary. Since 1992, Reggae Gold has been a popular series and a big seller for VP Records. A series select each year’s most popular tunes of dancehall, roots, reggae, lovers rock.

The first disc featured the recent hits, including Konshens’ “Gal a Bubble” and ”Do Sum'n”, Popcaan’s “Only Man She Want”, Busy Signal’s “Come Over (Missing You)”, Cham’s “Wine”, Sean Paul’s “She Doesn't Mind”, Potential Kidd’s “Yah Suh Nice”, Christopher Martin’s “Cheater's Prayer”, Tarrus Riley’s “Not Missing You”, Gyptian’s “Overtime” and more.

The second disc is a selection of classic hits from the past years, since 1992. Disc 2 featured artists are: Wayne Wonder, Gyptian, Sean Paul, Beenie Man, Bounty Killer, General Degree,  Mr. Vegas, Mavado, Beres Hammond & Buju Banton, I Wayne, Sizzla, Tanya Stephens, Queen Ifrica, Lady Saw, T.O.K., Morgan Heritage, Terry Linen.
Reggae Gold 2012 has been on the Billboard Top 200 chart and got a first place on the Reggae Album chart.

Executive Producer
Chris Chin

Disc 1

Disc 2

References

Reggae compilation albums
2012 compilation albums